Mutin may refer to:

Thierry Mutin, French singer and songwriter
French ship Mutin, a list of French ships bearing the name